Preston Elliott (May 1, 1875 – January 12, 1939) was a Canadian farmer and politician from Ontario. Born in Chesterville, Ontario to William Elliott and Mary Agnes Rae, he served in the House of Commons of Canada for the Dundas electoral district as a Progressive. Elected in 1921, he was defeated in the 1925 federal election. He was a Progressive candidate in 1926 and a Liberal in 1935, but lost both attempts at re-election. He was a member of the Ginger Group.

References 

1875 births
1939 deaths
Canadian farmers
Members of the House of Commons of Canada from Ontario
Progressive Party of Canada MPs
Ginger Group MPs
People from the United Counties of Stormont, Dundas and Glengarry
Candidates in the 1935 Canadian federal election
Liberal Party of Canada candidates for the Canadian House of Commons